Abu ol Verdi Rural District is a rural district (dehestan) in Hakhamanish District, Pasargad County, Fars Province, Iran. At the 2006 census, its population was 2,451, in 574 families.  The rural district has 2 villages.

References 

Rural Districts of Fars Province
Pasargad County